Kuala Kapuas (abbreviated: KLK) is the regency seat of Kapuas Regency and also one of the major towns in Central Kalimantan. This town is at a distance of 137 km northeast of Palangka Raya city, the capital of Central Kalimantan Province. The area of this town is mainly situated within eight sub-districts in the district of Selat i.e. the sub-district of Selat Barat, Selat Dalam, Selat Tengah, Selat Hulu, Selat Hilir, Selat Utara, Telo Island, and New Telo Island. The total population of Kuala Kapuas as of 2019 is approximately 55,573 people

Demographics 
As of 2019, the total population of Kuala Kapuas is about 55,573 inhabitants which represents 91% of the population of Selat district and 15.6% of the entire population of Kapuas Regency. The population density of this town is approximately 1,209/km2 which one of the highest amongst towns in Central Kalimantan. This town has 14,142 households and the average household size of this town is roughly 3.9 people. The sex ratio of this town is 104 which means there are 104 males to every 100 females.

References 

Populated places in Central Kalimantan
Regency seats of Central Kalimantan
Kapuas Regency